Caret is a surname. Notable people with the surname include:

François Caret (1802–1844), French Catholic priest 
Leanne Caret (born 1966), American businesswoman
Robert Caret (born 1947), former chancellor of the University of Maryland